Saida Shavkatovna Mirziyoyeva (born 4 November 1984) is an Uzbekistani politician. She is head of the Communications and Information Policy Branch of the Executive Office of the Presidential Administration. She is eldest daughter of the President of Uzbekistan Shavkat Mirziyoyev.

Early life and education
Mirziyoyeva was born on 4 November 1984 in Kokand, Fergana Region to politician Shavkat Mirziyoyev and Ziroatkhan Mirziyoyeva. She has a sister, Shahnoza, and a brother, Miralisher. She has a bachelor's degree in international law from the University of World Economy and Diplomacy. In 2008, she received a master's degree in law from the Tashkent State University of Law. In 2010, she received a master's degree in economics from Moscow State University.

Scientific career
Since 2010, Mirziyoyeva has been conducting research and development in the field of developing and implementing methodologies for national, regional and specific sector strategies based on the rules of strategy theory. She has been a researcher at the Academy of Public Administration and works as a researcher at the Center for Strategic Studies of Moscow State University. She is the author of a number of scientific publications devoted to the analysis of local experience and world practice in planning socio-economic processes, the assessment of the impact of global and national trends on state and regional strategies, as well as the improvement of the methodology for the formation of short, medium and long-term national strategies of socio-economic development.

Political career
From 12 April 2019 to 29 January 2020, Mirziyoyeva worked as the deputy director of the Information and Mass Communications Agency. As the deputy director of the agency, she coordinated the activities of the PR-center, and supervised issues of transparency in state and administrative bodies. She implemented projects within 5 initiatives of President Mirziyoyev. She actively worked to establish contacts between the agency and international organizations working in the field of freedom of speech. She visited a number of countries as part of delegations on issues of media development in Uzbekistan.

Under the auspices of Mirziyoyeva, the activities of the "Eye of Heart" project aimed at supporting blind children and providing them with educational, artistic, scientific and other necessary literature published in Braille were expanded. Also, within the framework of the project, practical work is being carried out to create an inclusive environment in the country's cultural institutions. Tiflo commentary system is being introduced in theaters.

On 31 January 2020, Mirziyoyeva assumed the position of deputy chairman of the Board of Trustees of the Public Fund for Support and Development of the National Mass Media. Even after getting a new job, she continued to help in the implementation of the "Kongil Kozi" project. She has been actively participating in the implementation of reforms aimed at the development of mass media and ensuring freedom of speech in Uzbekistan. She supported the abolition of imprisonment for defamation and insult.

Mirziyoyeva has been a member of the Gender Equality Commission since 2019. In February 2020, she participated in The Power of Influence Global Women's Forum, hosted by Dubai Women's Organization in Dubai..

On 14 November 2022, Mirziyoyeva assumes position of department manager in Uzbek President’s Administration

Personal life
Mirziyoyeva is married to Oybek Tursunov and they have 3 children.

References

1984 births
Living people
Children of national leaders
21st-century Uzbekistani women politicians
Moscow State University alumni
Women government ministers of Uzbekistan